Indian Rocks is a group of rocks in eastern Hero Bay on the north side of Livingston Island in the South Shetland Islands, Antarctica.  The area was visited by early 19th century sealers operating from Blythe Bay.

The feature is named after the British sealing vessel Indian under Captain Spiller that visited the South Shetlands in 1820-21 and brought back some of the crew of the wrecked ship Cora from nearby Desolation Island.

Location

Maps
 L.L. Ivanov. Antarctica: Livingston Island and Greenwich, Robert, Snow and Smith Islands. Scale 1:120000 topographic map.  Troyan: Manfred Wörner Foundation, 2009.

References
Composite Antarctic Gazetteer.

Rock formations of Livingston Island